James Gardner Brooks Jr. (August 12, 1942 – December 1, 1999), known as Stephen Brooks, was an American film and television actor.

Life 
Born in Columbus, Ohio, Brooks was best known as Special Agent Jim Rhodes in the first two seasons of the television series The F.B.I. (1965-1967). His guest appearances included roles as Ensign Garrovick in the Star Trek episode "Obsession" (1967), and as Officer Joe Nash in The Invaders second season episode "The Life Seekers" (1968).

Death 
He died of a heart attack, aged 57, in Seattle, Washington.

External links

1942 births
1999 deaths
American male television actors
Male actors from Columbus, Ohio
20th-century American male actors